The Dubysa Regiment was a Lithuanian infantry regiment commanded by Bolesław Kołyszko during the Uprising of 1863. It was named after the river Dubysa. The regiment fought mostly in the Kaunas Governorate and ranged in strength from 700 to 1,170 members.

Formation 
The Dubysa Regiment began as a rebel group that was organized near Kaunas by Bolesław Kołyszko in March 1863. It began forming in the coastal forests along the Dubysa, specifically between Čekiškė and Aukštdvaris. Kołyszko's group was joined by the groups of Bronislavas Žarskis and Antanas Norvaiša and the combined group was called the Dubysa Regiment.

Among the regiment's members was Aleksandras Vytartas, the vicar of Čekiškė's , in which he announced the Uprising's Manifesto.

Battles 
Kołyszko led the regiment in fights against units of the Imperial Russian Army at Aukštdvaris on March 29, near Lenčiai on April 1, near  on April 11.

References

Further reading 

 Dubysos Pulkas - article by Antanas Vaičius published on page 5 of the magazine Naujos tėviškės žinios on 29 March 2001. (Source)

January Uprising
Infantry regiments of Lithuania